The Main Street Commercial Historic District is located in Watertown, Wisconsin.

The district is made up of Watertown's old downtown with 127 contributing buildings, including the 1855 Commercial Vernacular Johnson Drug Store, the 1855 Italianate Dennis Block, the 1858 Italianate Misegades Wagon Works, the 1876 Queen Anne/Romanesque Platz and Brandt dry goods Store, and the 1907 Neoclassical Public Library.

It includes the Masonic Temple (1906), also known as Fischer Department Store.

References

Historic districts on the National Register of Historic Places in Wisconsin
National Register of Historic Places in Jefferson County, Wisconsin